Afton is a hamlet just outside Freshwater on the west side of the Isle of Wight. It features a local hill known as Afton Down which was the site of the Isle of Wight Festival in 1970, one of the largest rock concerts to be held in the UK. Freshwater Bay Golf Course is located on Afton Down. Afton lends its name to a number of local properties, including Afton Lodge, Afton Manor and Afton Thatch, the latter two dating from the 17th Century.

As a filming location Exterior scenes of the Cult film Guest House Paradiso, starring Adrian Edmondson and Rik Mayall, were filmed on the A3055 (Military Road), leading into the town.

A barrow located on Afton Down has been the subject of archaeological interest, and is thought to be from the Bronze Age.

A yearly Apple Day Festival takes place every fall at a commercial nursery known as Afton Park. The Apple Festival draws several thousand people a year to enjoy entertainment, a children's "apple olympics", and demonstrations.

Transport is provided by Southern Vectis route 7, which runs close by.

References

External links
Apple Day Festival official site

Hamlets on the Isle of Wight